Sambaa K'e (Slavey language: "place of trout"; formerly Trout Lake) is a "Designated Authority" in the Dehcho Region of the Northwest Territories, Canada. The community is located near the Alberta border, east of Fort Liard, on the shore of the lake also known as Sambaa K'e. It has no all-weather road, but can be reached by winter road early in the year or by air (Sambaa K'e Aerodrome) year-round.

On June 21, 2016, the settlement officially changed its name from "Trout Lake" to "Sambaa K'e", its name in the Slavey language, meaning "place of trout".

Demographics

The majority of its 2016 population (80 people) are First Nations and 45 report South Slavey as a first language.

First Nations
The Dene of the community are represented by the Sambaa K'e First Nation and belong to the Dehcho First Nations.

Services
The community has a small general store and a health centre and no RCMP. Canada Post mail arrives weekly by charter plane. Residents can order books, movies and CDs through the Borrow by Mail program offered by the NWT Public Library Services. There is a small airport, Sambaa K'e Aerodrome, and in the summer Trout Lake Water Aerodrome is in operation.

The community runs the Sambaa K'e Fishing Lodge, an authentic northern fishing experience, in the summer months.

References

External links 
 Sambaa K'e proposed protected area

Communities in the Dehcho Region
Dene communities
Hudson's Bay Company trading posts
Road-inaccessible communities of the Northwest Territories